Thomas Stewart (1925-30 October 1994) was an Irish Columban priest, who served as Bishop of the Roman Catholic Diocese of Chunchon in South Korea from 1966 until 1994.

Stewart was born in 1925 in Woodford, County Galway, Ireland. He was ordained a priest in 1950 for the Missionary Society of St. Columban, and went to South Korea in 1954. He served as Vicar General in the Chunchon Diocese before being elevated in 1966 to Bishop.

For health reasons, Stewart retired in May 1994.  He died a few months later in Ireland of a heart attack.

References

1925 births
1994 deaths
Irish expatriate Catholic bishops
Missionary Society of St. Columban
People from County Galway
People educated at Garbally College
20th-century Roman Catholic bishops in South Korea
Roman Catholic bishops of Chunchon